José Reis Pereira (10 December 1943 – 25 January 2023) was a Brazilian teacher and politician. A member of the Brazilian Democratic Movement Party and the Brazilian Social Democracy Party, he served in the Legislative Assembly of Piauí from 1987 to 1991.

Pereira died on 25 January 2023, at the age of 79.

References

1943 births
2023 deaths
Brazilian Democratic Movement politicians
Brazilian Social Democracy Party politicians
Members of the Legislative Assembly of Piauí